Eric Omondi (born 9 March 1983) is a Kenyan comedian and actor. He made his comedy debut in Churchill Show, a comedy show that airs on NTV in 2008. He has since won three African Entertainment Awards USA for 'Best Comedian' in 2018, 2019 and 2020.

Early life and education 
Eric is the second-born in a family of four in Kisumu County. He attended Kondele primary school then Kisumu Boys High School. He later joined Daystar University and pursued a course in Mass Communication and Journalism.

Career 
Eric started his career with a brief stint as a news reporter for NTV Kenya before meeting Daniel Ndambuki in 2006. He broke into the limelight in 2008 after he made an appearance on NTV's Churchill Show. In 2015, he left the show, to host his own show called Hawayuni, which aired on KTN but was short-lived. He also did ‘Somewhere in Africa’ and ‘Untamed’.

In March 2017, Eric became the first Kenyan ever to appear on The Tonight Show Starring Jimmy Fallon.

In 2020, he introduced a controversial show dubbed 'Wife Material' with its first season coming to an end with a wedding with Band Beca's Carol. The second season featured women from Kenya, Tanzania and Uganda which saw him arrested. The show was later suspended by the Kenya Film and Classification Board (KFCB).

Activism
In February 2022, Eric Omondi with 16 other people demonstrated against the high cost of living outside Parliament, Nairobi Kenya. They were charged with taking part in an unlawful assembly. They were later released with cash bail of KES 10,000 each.

Awards 

|-
! scope="row" | 2018
|rowspan="8"| African Entertainment Awards USA
| Best African Comedian
|rowspan="8"| Himself
| 
|
|-
! scope="row" rowspan="3"| 2019
| Best African Comedian
| 
|rowspan="3"|
|-
|African King Of Comedy
|
|-
|Best Host
|
|-
! scope="row" | 2020
| Best African Comedian
| 
|
|-
! scope="row" rowspan="3"| 2021
|Media Personality of the Year
|
|-
|Social Media Influencer of the Year
|
|-
|Best African Comedian
|

References

Kenyan male comedians
1987 births
Living people
Kenyan stand-up comedians